Liesbeth or Liesbet (both pronounced ) is a Dutch language feminine given name. It is a relatively common form of Elisabeth, peaking in popularity between 1955 and 1985. An older spelling of the name was "Lijsbeth" People with the name include:

Liesbeth
Liesbeth van Altena (1833–1906), pen name of the Dutch novelist and playwright Betsy Perk
Liesbeth Bik (born 1959), Dutch conceptual artist
Liesbeth Homans (born 1973), Belgian N-VA politician
 (born 1975), Dutch film actress
Liesbeth List (born 1941), Dutch singer, stage actress and television personality
Liesbeth Mau Asam (born 1982), Dutch short track speed skater
Liesbeth Messer-Heijbroek (1914–2007), Dutch sculptor and medal maker
Liesbeth Migchelsen (born 1971), Dutch footballer
Liesbeth Mouha (born 1983), Belgian beach volleyball player
Liesbeth Pascal-de Graaff (born 1946), Dutch rower
Liesbeth van der Pol (born 1959), Dutch architect
Liesbeth Schlumberger (born 1964), South African organist
Liesbeth Spies (born 1966), Dutch Minister of the Interior
Liesbeth van Tongeren (born 1958),  Dutch politician and director of Greenpeace Netherlands
Liesbeth Tuijnman (born 1943), Dutch mayor
Lieja Tunks (born Liesbeth Jantina Tunks, 1976), Dutch-born Canadian shot putter
Liesbeth Vernout (born 1958), Dutch cricketer
Liesbeth Vosmaer-de Bruin (born 1946), Dutch rower
Liesbeth Zegveld (born 1970), Dutch lawyer, legal expert and professor

Liesbet
Liesbet De Vocht (born 1979), Belgian road bicycle racer
Liesbet Dreesen (born 1976), Belgian swimmer
Liesbet Hooghe (born 1962), Belgian political scientist
Liesbet Van Breedam (born 1979), Belgian beach volleyball player 
Liesbet Vindevoghel (born 1979), Belgian volleyball player

References

Dutch feminine given names